Viewpoint discrimination is a concept in United States jurisprudence related to the First Amendment to the  United States Constitution. If a speech act is treated differently by a government entity based on the viewpoint it expresses, this is considered viewpoint discrimination.

See also
 Cancel culture

References

First Amendment to the United States Constitution
Free speech case law